Joseph F. Bonetto (April 20, 1921 – February 18, 1988) was a Democratic member of the Pennsylvania House of Representatives.

References

Democratic Party members of the Pennsylvania House of Representatives
1921 births
1988 deaths
20th-century American politicians